S. equi  may refer to:
 Sarcoptes equi, a mite species found on horses
 Streptococcus equi, the strangles or equine distemper, a bacterium species causing a contagious, upper respiratory tract infection of horses and other equines

See also
 Equi (disambiguation)